Fabian Brandner is a fictional character on the German soap opera Verbotene Liebe (Forbidden Love). The character was portrayed by Shai Hoffmann from January 22, 2008 to August 14, 2008 and in guest appearances from January 12, 2009 to January 22, 2009.

Character's background

Fabian is a young artist and his dream is it to learn at a design school in Tokyo. When his parents, Matthias (Thomas Ohrner) and Katja (Diana Frank), move to Düsseldorf, after Lydia (Theresa Underberg), Fabian's older sister found a job there, he believes that this only is a short stop for him and he hopes to write a good application so that his dream can come true. After his arrival he soon gets attention from Lisa (Lilli Hollunder), who begins to fall for him. But Fabian refuses the flirtation with her and wants to concentrate on his future. But Lisa make him believe that she wants just a little bit fun with him. They end up kissing and Lisa hopes that sooner or later will come more out of this. But then Fabian meets Judith Hagendorf (Katrin Heß) and shows interest for her as Judith as well for him. 
Lisa sees a really competition in Judith and tries to talk to Fabian out of her. When this doesn't work, Lisa becomes more a vixen and tells Judith that she was too late and Fabian would be already her boyfriend. Judith backed off, but soon later finds out that Lisa and Fabian aren't together. But Lisa doesn't give up yet and forces herself to Fabian, when she shows up completely naked in his room. The spend one night together. The next day, Lisa thinks that she finally has one Fabian for herself now, but he saw that only as a one-time thing and doesn't want to repeat that. Meanwhile, Judith finds out about Fabian's little adventure with Lisa and can't believe what kind of a guy Fabian might really be. In her eyes, Fabian should have seen that Lisa is more interested in him as just friends or a little affair. But Fabian refuses to know about Lisa's feelings for him. 
Lisa can't believe that her plan didn't work and puts up a lie, when she tells her grandfather Arno (Konrad Krauss) that Fabian seduced her. Arno is furious with Fabian and wants him to apologize to Lisa. After the tension in the Brandner house, Fabian can prove to Judith that he doesn't want to be with Lisa, but with her. They eventually become a couple, which doesn't let Lisa to back off. She wants to destroy the new couple and sees an opportunity, when Fabian wants to send his application for the design school to Tokyo. He gives the important letter to his father, who leaves the application on the desk for a few minutes, where Lisa comes into the scene and destroys the papers. After her little skin, Matthias gives Judith the application to bring it into the mail box, as she promised before, what Lisa heard.

Later Fabian and Judith become a couple, but their happiness is short lived, when Fabian discovers that his mother had a one-night stand with Sebastian von Lahnstein (Joscha Kiefer), the boyfriend of his sister Lydia. Judith knew about it and didn't tell Fabian. He can't forgive her and breaks up with her. Fabian also can't forgive Katja and leaves the country to live with his brother David Brandner (Sven Koller) in Australia.

On Katja's birthday in December 2008, he calls his mother and congratulates her. That will be the last conversation they both have. Short time after, Katja dies after she gave birth to her baby girl Christina. Fabian returns for her funeral in January, before he leaves again and returns to Australia.

References

Verbotene Liebe characters
Television characters introduced in 2008